"Glory" is a song by English indie pop band Bastille. It was released on 5 June 2017 as the fourth and final single from their second studio album, Wild World (2016). The song was written by Dan Smith, who handled the production along with Mark Crew.

Background
In an interview with NME, Dan Smith said, "The song is about friendship and those woozy middle-of-the-night chats that drunkenly seem so important at the time. It's my favourite track on "Wild World", and we wanted the video to be a celebration of storytelling, relationships, and how two people can remember things completely differently."

Music video
A music video to accompany the release of "Glory" was first released onto YouTube on 5 June 2017 at a total length of five minutes. The video was filmed in Dallas during the band's US tour and sees Dan Smith on an epic road trip. According to a press release, the band "attempts to make sense of a post truth era" in the video.

Track listing

Charts

References

2016 songs
Bastille (band) songs
Songs written by Dan Smith (singer)